The Metro Area Express (MAX) is an express bus service with bus rapid transit characteristics run by the Kansas City Area Transportation Authority in Kansas City, Missouri, United States. The first line, on Main Street, was first operated on July 24, 2005; the second line, on Troost Avenue, opened on January 1, 2011; and the third line, on Prospect Avenue, opened on December 9, 2019. MAX operates as a hybrid of traditional bus service and Bus Rapid Transit or BRT-lite.

MAX features dedicated lanes and special traffic signalization holds a green light longer to keep services on schedule. The fares for the Metro Area Express is $1.50, collected on board, with free transfer to the rest of the Metro system.

Lines

Main Street MAX  

The Main Street MAX mostly runs along Main Street in Kansas City, Missouri.  The line opened on July 24, 2005.  It runs from City Market in Downtown Kansas City, MO to the Waldo Neighborhood. It is slated to be replaced in the future by an extension of the KC Streetcar.

Troost Avenue MAX 
The Troost Avenue MAX runs mostly on Troost Avenue in Kansas City, Missouri.  The line opened on January 1, 2011. It runs from Barney Allis Plaza in Downtown Kansas City Missouri to 3-Trails Transit Center in Ruskin Heights.

Prospect Avenue MAX 
The Prospect Avenue MAX runs mostly on Prospect Avenue in Kansas City, Missouri. The line runs from Barney Allis Plaza in Downtown KCMO to 75th and Prospect with a possible extension to Bannister and Drury. New transit centers are being planned downtown and at Bannister Road and Blue Ridge Blvd to relocate from Bannister and Drury, which will be served by Troost MAX and Prospect MAX. Cerner is redeveloping the old Bannister Mall site into an office park. The line began service on December 9, 2019.

References

Kansas City Area Transportation Authority